Andriy Stryzheus (born 18 August 1995) is a professional Ukrainian football midfielder who plays for Osipovichi. He is a graduate of Volyn Lutsk youth system.

References

External links
 
 
 

1995 births
Living people
Footballers from Lutsk
Ukrainian footballers
Association football midfielders
Ukrainian expatriate footballers
Expatriate footballers in Belarus
Ukrainian expatriate sportspeople in Belarus
FC Dynamo Brest players
FC Volyn Lutsk players
FC Krumkachy Minsk players
FC Granit Mikashevichi players
FC Smorgon players
FC Slonim-2017 players
FC Smolevichi players
FC Osipovichi players